"Painkiller" is a song by English heavy metal band Judas Priest, released in 1990; it was later released as a single on Columbia Records. It is off the band's twelfth album of the same name as the opening track. The lyrics tell the story of the Painkiller, the character featured on the cover of the album, who is a cyborg superhero who saves mankind from destruction.

The song has since-then remained one of the band's signature songs.

Composition

The song is written in E minor, but the key signature changes during the guitar solos. The first guitar solo in the song, which alternates between the keys of F# minor and C# minor, is played by Glenn Tipton. The second, also in F# minor, is played by K. K. Downing. The song is noted for Rob Halford's high pitched screeching throughout the song as well as Scott Travis' complex drumming. Tipton has also stated that the Painkiller solo is his favourite to play. It is also his first recorded solo to heavily feature the technique of sweep picking.

Reception
The song was nominated for the Grammy Award for Best Metal Performance during the 33rd Grammy Awards (1991), the second year the award was presented.

PopMatters said, "Nobody saw this song coming. Featuring a thunderous intro by new drummer Scott Travis – a colossal improvement over the technically limited Dave Holland – and highlighted by Halford’s maniacal performance, this was Priest embracing extremity without pandering, and sounding once again vital, relevant, and best of all, more powerful than ever."

In 2012, Loudwire ranked the song number two on its list of the 10 greatest Judas Priest songs. In 2019, Louder Sound ranked the song number one on its list of the 50 greatest Judas Priest songs.

Cover versions
Death metal band Death covered the song on their album The Sound of Perseverance.

Power metal band Angra covered the song on their EP Freedom Call.

Japanese band Babymetal performed an abridged version of the song at the 2016 Alternative Press Music Awards alongside Rob Halford, which led into another Judas Priest song, "Breaking the Law." Babymetal performed these songs later in the year during their tour supporting Red Hot Chili Peppers, with singer Su-metal performing all vocals and RHCP's Chad Smith playing drums.

Personnel
Judas Priest
Rob Halford – vocals
Glenn Tipton – guitar
K. K. Downing – guitar
Ian Hill – bass (credit only)
Scott Travis – drums
Additional musicians
Don Airey – moogbass

Charts

References

Judas Priest songs
1990 singles
Songs written by Rob Halford
Songs written by Glenn Tipton
Songs written by K. K. Downing
Black-and-white music videos
Music videos directed by Wayne Isham
Columbia Records singles
1990 songs